The 2005–06 Arkansas Razorbacks men's basketball team represented the University of Arkansas in the 2005–06 college basketball season. The head coach was Stan Heath, serving for his fourth year. The team played its home games in Bud Walton Arena in Fayetteville, Arkansas.

Schedule

|-
!colspan=7| 2006 SEC men's basketball tournament

|-
!colspan=7| 2006 NCAA Division I men's basketball tournament

Source:

References

Arkansas
Arkansas Razorbacks men's basketball seasons
Arkansas Razorbacks men's basketball
Arkansas Razorbacks men's basketball
Arkansas